Live is an album by Bob Weir and Rob Wasserman. It was recorded in the fall of 1988, except for one track, "Eternity", which was recorded in the summer of 1992. The album was released in 1998.

Track listing
 "Festival" (Weir)
 "Walking Blues" (Robert Johnson)
 "The Winners" (Weir, Rudyard Kipling)
 "K.C. Moan" (Traditional)
 "Victim or the Crime" (Weir, Gerrit Graham)
 "Looks Like Rain" (Weir, John Perry Barlow)
 "Easy to Slip" (Martin Kibbee, Lowell George)
 "Fever" (John Davenport, Eddie Cooley)
 "Eternity" (Weir, Wasserman, Willie Dixon)
 "This Time Forever" (Weir, Barlow)
 "Shade of Grey" (Weir, Barlow)
 "Heaven Help the Fool" (Weir, Barlow)
 "Blue Sky Bop" (Wasserman)
 "Throwing Stones" (Weir, Barlow)

Credits

Musicians
 Bob Weir–acoustic guitar, vocals
 Rob Wasserman–electric upright bass

Production
 Produced by Rob Wasserman
 Recorded by John Cutler (fall 1988), except "Eternity" recorded by Howard Danchik (summer 1992)
 Mastered by Joe Gastwirt
 Mastering assisted by Ramón Bretón
 Cover and back photo by Rob Cohn
 Inside photos by Jay Blakesberg
 Package design by Amy Finkle
 Liner notes by Rob Wasserman and Bob Weir

References

Bob Weir albums
1998 live albums
Grateful Dead Records live albums